Paula Allodya Item, also known as Audy Item, (born April 23, 1983) is an Indonesian singer.

Personal life 
Item is the youngest of three children born to jazz musician Jopie Item, and Evie Aquanthie Aziz. She is married to Iko Uwais and they have two daughters.

Career

2002–2004: 18 and 20-02 
Audy signed a recording contract with Sony BMG Music Indonesia and releasing debut studio album 18 which took from her age. Her debut single "Janji Diatas Ingkar (Mendua)" was released in 2002 and became a success in Indonesian music charts. Other singles were produced, such as "Bila Saja", "Menangis Semalam" and "Arti Hadirmu". The album has seen success and became best-selling in the market, including some singles, and making her winning many awards at other annual awards, Most Favorite Female at the 2003 MTV Indonesia Awards, four awards at the Anugerah Musik Indonesia, including Best Pop Album, etc.

Her second studio album 20-02 was released in 2004 and got back successful with single "Lagu Sendu" and "Dibalas Dengan Dusta" which manage earning for Favorite Artist Indonesia at the 2004 MTV Asia Awards in Singapore. Audy had listed by MURI for most signature in album during two hours. In 2005, Audy returning released repackaged version and adding new single, "Temui Aku", "Pertama Kali", and other.

2006–2010: 23-03 and Selalu Terdepan 
After her 20-02, Audy returning released third studio album 23-03 and produced first single "Untuk Sahabat" with Indonesian singer and actress Nindy, which was used in a commercial for Olay. She had collaboration with Canadian pop duo Same Same "Without You" for her Indonesian version. Previously, never collaboration with used version in other countries, like Thailand, Malaysia, Philippines and China.

After four years vacuum, Audy released fourth studio album Selalu Terdepan, which became her last album in music career. First single "Lama Lama Aku Bosan" is her comeback in music industry. Her album also released in Malaysia after two years ago.

Discography

Studio albums 
 18 (2002)
 20-02 (2004)
 20-02 Repackage (2005)
 23-03 (2006)
 Selalu Terdepan (2010)

Awards and nominations

References

External links 
  Prosesi adat di Pernikahan Iko dan Audy
 

1983 births
Living people
People from Jakarta
Minahasa people
Sundanese people
21st-century Indonesian women singers
Anugerah Musik Indonesia winners